Jurrick Juliana (born 21 July 1984) is a Curaçaoan former professional footballer.

Career
Born in Willemstad, Curaçao in the former Netherlands Antilles, Juliana began playing professional football with AGOVV Apeldoorn, initially signing a three-year contract in 2003. The striker scored 31 goals in 112 league matches for AGOVV before signing with SC Cambuur in August 2007. He would also play for FC Dordrecht in the Eerste Divisie.

Juliana received a call-up from Netherlands Antilles national football team manager Pim Verbeek in December 2003, but his club refused to release him for international duty.

References

1984 births
Living people
Dutch footballers
SC Cambuur players
AGOVV Apeldoorn players
Eerste Divisie players
Derde Divisie players
FC Dordrecht players
DVS '33 players
People from Willemstad
Curaçao footballers
Association football forwards